The FIBA EuroBasket 2005 Division B was the first EuroBasket Division B tournament, the lower tier of the EuroBasket Tournament. At the same time that Division A had the European Championship, division B had a championship to determine which teams would get promoted into division A for the following year.

FYR Macedonia and Denmark were promoted to the EuroBasket 2007 qualification.

Format
The fifteen teams were allocated in four groups. The winners of each group played a two-legged tie. The winners of each heat qualified for the EuroBasket 2007 qualification.

Teams

Results

Group stage

Group A

Group B

 
 
Head-to-head record

Group C

Group D

Qualification Games

Macedonia won 200–137 and advanced to Eurobasket 2007 Division A

Denmark won 152–150 and advanced to Eurobasket 2007 Division A

Statistical Leaders

Points

Rebounds

Assists

External links
 https://web.archive.org/web/20090812040433/http://eurobasket2005.fibaeurope.com/en/cid_SxABsY6cGsUtre3B9W0Og2.html
 https://web.archive.org/web/20110726164347/http://eurobasket2005.fibaeurope.com/en/cid_KKvc1Mc7HPcqdAKTK9Px21.html

2005
FIBA EuroBasket 2005
2004–05 in European basketball
2005–06 in European basketball